John Jacob Senn (March 28, 1828 – May 20, 1893) was a member of the Wisconsin State Assembly.

Biography
Senn was born in Toggenburg, Switzerland in March 1828, sources have differed on the exact date. He became a bugler in the Swiss military. In 1855, he settled in Fountain City, Wisconsin. Jobs Senn held up to that point include that of teacher. On May 8, 1861, he married Elsbeth Weibel. They had three children. During the American Civil War, Senn enlisted with the 9th Wisconsin Volunteer Infantry Regiment of the Union Army. Later, he became involved in the insurance industry, including working as an agent.

Political career
Senn was a member of the Assembly in 1877 and 1878. Other positions he held include County Treasurer and a member and President of the Board of Supervisors of Buffalo County, Wisconsin. He was a Republican.

References

External links
The Political Graveyard

People from Toggenburg
Swiss emigrants to the United States
People from Fountain City, Wisconsin
County supervisors in Wisconsin
Republican Party members of the Wisconsin State Assembly
People of Wisconsin in the American Civil War
Union Army soldiers
Swiss military personnel
Schoolteachers from Wisconsin
Insurance agents
Businesspeople from Wisconsin
1828 births
1893 deaths
19th-century American politicians
19th-century American businesspeople
19th-century American educators